Future Party was a local political party in Tingsryd, Sweden. Party leader is Ulf Nygren.

In the 2002 municipal polls it got 420 votes (5.3%) and three seats.

The party should not be confused with a marginal right-wing fringe party bearing the same name.

External links
 Party website
Swedish local political parties